Hercules and Deianira is an oil painting by Antonio del Pollaiuolo, executed c. 1470, originally on panel but later transferred to canvas. It shows the rape of Deianira by the centaur Nessus, with her husband Heracles drawing a bow at the right to shoot Nessus. It is now in the Yale University Art Gallery in New Haven.

References

Paintings depicting Heracles
Paintings by Antonio del Pollaiuolo
Paintings in the Yale University Art Gallery
1470 paintings